Sir Edmund Bacon, 4th Baronet (6 April 1672 – 10 July 1721) was an English politician.

He was the oldest son of Sir Henry Bacon, 3rd Baronet and his wife Sarah Castleton, daughter of Sir John Castleton, 2nd Baronet. In 1686, he succeeded his father as baronet. He studied at St John's College, Cambridge. Between 1700 and 1708, Bacon represented Orford and sat as Member of Parliament (MP) in both the Parliaments of England and Great Britain. He served as High Sheriff of Suffolk in 1665.

On 25 December 1688, he married Philippa Bacon, daughter of his cousin Sir Edmund Bacon, 4th Baronet, of Redgrave at Redgrave, Suffolk. Philippa died in 1710 and Bacon married again Mary Castell, daughter of John Castell at Raveningham on 16 April 1713. He had five sons and two daughters by his first wife and two sons and two daughters by his second wife. A week after his death, Bacon was buried at Gillingham, Norfolk. He was succeeded in the baronetcy successively by his three sons Edmund, Henry and Richard.

References

1672 births
1721 deaths
Edmund
Baronets in the Baronetage of England
British MPs 1707–1708
Alumni of St John's College, Cambridge
Members of the Parliament of Great Britain for English constituencies
English MPs 1698–1700
English MPs 1701
English MPs 1701–1702
English MPs 1702–1705
English MPs 1705–1707
High Sheriffs of Suffolk
People from South Norfolk (district)